Below is a complete list of songs by the Korean girl group After School.

0–9

A

B

C

D

E

F

G

H

I

J

K

L

M

P

R

S

T

V

W

Y

Other songs

See also
After School discography

After School
 
Songs